"She's on Fire" is a 1983 dance-pop, synthpop, and Hi-NRG song from the soundtrack of the film Scarface starring Al Pacino. The song was performed by singer Amy Holland, who had also recorded "Turn Out the Night" for the Scarface soundtrack.

Song information
Like "Turn Out the Night", this song had the lyrics written by Pete Bellotte and the music was done by Giorgio Moroder, the Italian music and record producer. This was the second and last of two songs that Amy Holland had recorded for the Scarface soundtrack. The song plays two times in the movie in the scene where Tony Montana is dancing with Elvira seemingly flirting with her, and in the scene where Tony is talking to Officer Mel Bernstein and watching his sister Gina dancing with her boyfriend Fernando. Like "Scarface (Push It to the Limit)", "She's on Fire" appears in the film in a slightly extended version with a guitar solo during the instrumental break and a repeat of the second verse. It is unknown if the extended version heard in the movie was released on a 12" vinyl record.

In other media
 The song appears in the 2001 video game Grand Theft Auto III, where it is featured on the in-game radio station Flashback 95.6 (Flashback FM) along with four other songs from the Scarface soundtrack. 
 The song was also used in the video game Scarface: The World is Yours. 
 The rapper Lil Wayne sampled this song for his hit "On Fire" from his 2010 album Rebirth.

References

1983 songs
Amy Holland songs
Hi-NRG songs
Scarface (1983 film)
Song recordings produced by Giorgio Moroder
Songs written by Giorgio Moroder
Songs written by Pete Bellotte
MCA Records singles